Water Taxi Service operates in the Trinidadian cities as an alternate form of transportation to and from Port of Spain and San Fernando.

Operations and restrictions
Water taxis are publicly run.

Schedule
 
Departure from San Fernando
AM-    5:30*  6:30*  7:45*
 
PM-    3:00        4:30

Departure from Port of Spain
AM-    6:30         7:00
 
PM-     1:30         3:30*       4:30*       5:30

Peak times 
 
For more information, please contact The Water Taxi Service office at Flat Rock in San Fernando at:
 800-4987 and 
Port of Spain Terminal 
624- 3281 or 624- 6563

Ticketing
 
Tickets can be purchased at both the Port of Spain and San Fernando terminals for any sailing up to one week in advance.
Ferry capacity is limited to 403 seated passengers plus 2 wheelchair spaces.

Seating is on a first come - first served basis. 
Payment can be made via cash, linx or visa/master card. 
We ask that groups of 15 or more passengers call in advance.

-$15.00 one-way fare

-Senior Citizens (65 AND OVER) travel free of charge on off-peak sailings upon presentation of valid Trinidad and Tobago photo I.D.

-Infants under the age of one year travel free of charge.

Expansion 
Water Taxis expansion is under construction for terminals at Chaguanas, Point Fortin, and Point Cumana.

Operators

Stations

Current fleet vessels

Former fleet vessels

See also

Water taxi
NIDCO

References

External links
Water Taxi Service sailing schedule
Vessel specifications

Water transport in Trinidad and Tobago
Water taxis
2008 establishments in Trinidad and Tobago